Francinilson Santos Meirelles, (born 3 May 1990 in São Luís, Maranhão), commonly known as Maranhão, is a Brazilian footballer who plays for Chapecoense as an attacking midfielder.

Honours
Daejeon Citizen
K League Challenge: 2014

Chapecoense
Campeonato Catarinense: 2016

References

External links
 
 

1990 births
Living people
People from São Luís, Maranhão
Brazilian footballers
Association football midfielders
Campeonato Brasileiro Série A players
Esporte Clube Bahia players
Club Athletico Paranaense players
Associação Chapecoense de Futebol players
Fluminense FC players
Associação Atlética Ponte Preta players
Goiás Esporte Clube players
Centro Sportivo Alagoano players
Liga MX players
Cruz Azul footballers
K League 2 players
Daejeon Hana Citizen FC players
Brazilian expatriate footballers
Brazilian expatriate sportspeople in Mexico
Brazilian expatriate sportspeople in South Korea
Expatriate footballers in Mexico
Expatriate footballers in South Korea
Sportspeople from Maranhão